Stanistreet is a surname. Notable people with the surname include:

 Henry Stanistreet (1901–1981), Irish bishop
 John Stanistreet (1913–1971), Australian politician
 Michelle Stanistreet (born 1974), English trade unionist and journalist